Songs About Fucking is the second and final full-length studio album by the punk rock band Big Black, released in 1987 by Touch and Go records, and reissued in 2018. The album includes a rendition of Kraftwerk's "The Model" in a remixed version from that which appeared on Big Black's then-recent single. The compact disc of Songs About Fucking added the other side of that single, a cover of Cheap Trick's "He's a Whore".

Production
Steve Albini has said that Songs About Fucking is the Big Black album that he is most satisfied with. In a 1992 interview with Maximumrocknroll magazine, Albini said: 

The band had already decided to split up before the album was recorded, prompted by guitarist Santiago Durango's decision to enroll in law school, and the band's desire to quit at what they felt was a creative peak.

Critical reception

Songs About Fucking has been called "certainly the most honest album title of the rock 'n' roll era". Lyrical themes on the album include South American killing techniques ("Colombian Necktie"), bread that gets you high ("Ergot"), and how "slowly, without trying, everyone becomes what he despises most". While the album's title (commonly blanked out when displayed in shops on its release) and the sleeve were controversial, according to one reviewer, "as brutal as that cover is, the music is even more so", and it was considered "as dark and frightening as the band name suggests" by another, Treble's Hubert Vigilla, who goes on to say "Songs About Fucking is loud, it's abrasive, it's unattractive in the extreme ... So really, it's everything that made Big Black so great in the first place". Dave Henderson of Underground magazine gave the album a 2.5/3 rating, calling it "a napalm attack that sticks to your skin like burning party-jell, spiced with hundreds and thousands, a prickly sensation that's as all-consuming as it is repellent". Reviewing for The Village Voice in April 1988, Robert Christgau found Albini's innovative guitar sounds undeniable: "That killdozer sound culminates if not finishes off whole generations of punk and metal. In this farewell version it gains just enough clarity and momentum to make its inhumanity ineluctable, and the absence of lyrics that betray Albini's roots in yellow journalism reinforces an illusion of depth". Trouser Press later called it the band's "finest work" and "their most raging, abrasive, pulverizing record". 

When asked by The Guardian to name his top 20 albums, John Peel included Songs about Fucking as his fifteenth favourite album. Robert Plant claimed that the album had made him "an Albini fan," and Albini went on to be the recording engineer for the Page and Plant album Walking into Clarksdale (1998)

Accolades

Track listing

Personnel
Dave Riley – bass guitar
Santiago Durango (credited as Melvin Belli) – guitar
Steve Albini – guitar, vocals
"Roland" (a Roland TR-606 drum machine) – drums

References

Big Black albums
1987 albums
Touch and Go Records albums
Albums produced by Steve Albini
Blast First albums
Au Go Go Records albums